The 1981 Southwest Conference men's basketball tournament was held March 5–7 at HemisFair Arena in San Antonio, Texas. The first round took place March 2 at the higher seeded campus sites. 

Number 2 seed Houston defeated 6 seed  84-59 to win their 2nd championship and receive the conference's automatic bid to the 1981 NCAA tournament.

Format and seeding 
The tournament consisted of 9 teams in a single-elimination tournament. The 3 seed received a bye to the Quarterfinals and the 1 and 2 seed received a bye to the Semifinals.

Tournament

References 

1980–81 Southwest Conference men's basketball season
Basketball in San Antonio
Southwest Conference men's basketball tournament